Franco Gabriel Mussis (born 19 April 1992) is an Argentine professional footballer who plays as a midfielder for  club Montevarchi.

Career

Gimnasia La Plata
Mussis joined Gimnasia La Plata in the youth years. He received his first team debut on 15 April 2012 away against Gimnasia de Jujuy in the Primera B Nacional, after replacing Nicolas Alejandro Cabrera in the 74th minute. Despite not having many matches, Mussis became an undisputed pillar of the team. He scored his first goal on 10 March 2013 against Club Olimpo in a 3-0 victory. He was a permanent part of the Gimnasia La Plata team, won promotion to the Primera División on 28 May 2013 at the Estadio Mario Alberto Kempes.

On 8 December 2013 he scored his first Primera División goal in an away 1-1 draw against Boca Juniors.

Copenhagen
Mussis' performances in Gimnasia led to a transfer to Danish Superliga side Copenhagen, which was announced on 31 January 2014 and was effectuated after the 2013–14 season. He received a 5-year contract.

Loan to Genoa
However, due to difficulties for Mussis to adapt in Copenhagen regarding to language, culture and training, as well as Mussis not arriving in Copenhagen in as good physical shape as expected, he went on a season long loan to Genoa on 23 August 2014.

San Lorenzo
On 6 January 2015, Copenhagen and Genoa agreed on ending the loan deal 6 months early. Meanwhile, Mussis was sold to the Argentinian club San Lorenzo for an undisclosed figure.

Return to Gimnasia La Plata
Mussis returned to Gimnasia (LP), signing for the club on 4 January 2019.

Botoșani
In the summer of 2022, Mussis joined Liga I club Botoșani.

Montevarchi
On 31 January 2023, Mussis signed with Montevarchi in the Italian third-tier Serie C.

Honours 
San Lorenzo
Supercopa Argentina: 2015

References

External links

 

1992 births
Argentine footballers
Argentine expatriate footballers
Living people
Argentine people of Italian descent
Association football midfielders
Footballers from La Plata
Club de Gimnasia y Esgrima La Plata footballers
F.C. Copenhagen players
Genoa C.F.C. players
San Lorenzo de Almagro footballers
Atlético Tucumán footballers
FC Botoșani players
Montevarchi Calcio Aquila 1902 players
Liga I players
Argentine Primera División players
Primera Nacional players
Danish Superliga players
Serie A players
Serie C players
Argentine expatriate sportspeople in Denmark
Argentine expatriate sportspeople in Italy
Argentine expatriate sportspeople in Romania
Expatriate men's footballers in Denmark
Expatriate footballers in Italy
Expatriate footballers in Romania